Wilberforce Vaughan Eaves MBE (10 December 1867 – 10 February 1920) was an Australian-born tennis player from the United Kingdom. At the 1908 London Olympics he won a bronze medal in the Men's Singles tournament.

Biography
Eaves was born in Melbourne, Australia, son of William and Eunice Eaves of St Kilda, Victoria.

He reached the Men's Singles All-Comers' final at the Wimbledon Championships in 1895 and lost against Wilfred Baddeley despite having had a match point in the third set. In 1897 he became the first non-American to reach the final in the U.S. National Singles Championships. He lost the final in five sets to American Robert Wrenn. He was particularly successful on clay courts at the Dinard International Tournament in Brittany, France organized by the Dinard Lawn Tennis Club where he won that title ten times between (1894-1896) and (1902-1909).

Eaves won the Welsh Championships in 1895 and the Irish Championships in 1897, defeating Wilfred Baddeley in a five-set final. He became the Scottish singles champion in 1901 and won the British Covered Court Championships, played on wooden courts at Queen's Club in London three consecutive times from 1897 until 1899. He won against seven-time tournament champion Ernest Lewis and Wimbledon champions Laurence Doherty and Harold Mahony in the respective finals.

Qualified as a doctor of medicine, he served as a civil surgeon in the Boer War, and took a temporary commission in the Royal Army Medical Corps in the first week of World War I, on 10 August 1914, being promoted to Captain after a year's service. He was later awarded a MBE for his services and died in London, where he is buried in Greenwich Cemetery.

Grand Slam finals

Singles (1 runner-up)

See also
World number one male tennis player rankings

References

External links

 
 

1867 births
1920 deaths
19th-century British people
19th-century male tennis players
British Army personnel of World War I
British male tennis players
British people of Australian descent
Members of the Order of the British Empire
Olympic bronze medallists for Great Britain
Olympic medalists in tennis
Olympic tennis players of Great Britain
Royal Army Medical Corps officers
Tennis players from Melbourne
Tennis players at the 1908 Summer Olympics
Medalists at the 1908 Summer Olympics